North Bishop Avenue Commercial Historic District is located in Dallas, Texas (USA).

Description and history
North Bishop Avenue is the only street in the Oak Cliff neighborhood that can be considered a boulevard. The district is within the Hillside Addition, one of several sub–divisions built by the Dallas Land and Loan Company which was headed by the founder of Oak Cliff, Thomas Marsalis. It was added to the National Register of Historic Places on June 17, 1994 as a part of the "Oak Cliff Multiple Property Submission".

Modern times
Bike lanes and period lighting have been added to the Avenue and recent development has been architecturally appropriate and scaled to fit the historical neighborhood. The district is essentially the same as the Bishop Arts District. Tax incentives may be available to neighborhoods listed on the National Register but there is no legal protection from destruction, there are no local laws that provide such protection for the North Bishop Avenue Commercial Historic District.

Photo gallery

See also
 Arts district
 National Register of Historic Places listings in Dallas County, Texas

References

External links
 
  – photo at images tab
 

National Register of Historic Places in Dallas
Dallas Landmarks
Tudor Revival architecture in Texas
Historic districts on the National Register of Historic Places in Texas
Commercial buildings on the National Register of Historic Places in Texas